Sir Lancelot Raymond Adams-Schneider  (11 November 1919 – 3 September 1995) was a New Zealand politician of the National Party.

Biography

Early life and career
Lancelot Raymond Adams-Schneider was born in Wellington, New Zealand, to Arthur Archibald Adams and Hilda Mary Adams (née Biggs). His mother died when he was three years old, and his paternal aunt, Susan Isabella Schneider (née Adams) took on the care of her nephew. Later, Susan and her husband, Theodore Schneider, were to adopt Lance and he became Lance Adams-Schneider. He was educated at Eastern Hutt Primary School, Petone Memorial Technical College, and Mount Albert Grammar School, Auckland. He entered the drapery trade on leaving school and founded his own business in Auckland. Later he managed a large store in Taumarunui. During World War II, Adams-Schneider served in the Medical Corps. He later became a member of the Taumarunui Borough Council, president of the Chamber of Commerce, and an executive member of the New Zealand Retailers' Association.

In 1944, Adams-Schneider became engaged to Shirley Lois Brunton, and the couple married the following year.

Political career

His private enterprise position and retail experience influenced him politically and led him to become involved with the National Party. He became chairmans of the party's Taumaranui Branch and was later a publicity officer for the party's Waikato Division. He later sought the National Party nomination at a by-election in Bay of Plenty in early 1957, but was unsuccessful.

He then contested and won for National the 1959 Hamilton by-election held after the death of the incumbent MP, Dame Hilda Ross.

Adams-Schneider was a parliamentary under-secretary from 1964 to 1967, Minister of Broadcasting from 1967 to 1969, Minister of Customs from 1969 to 1972, Minister of Health and Minister of Social Welfare in 1972, and Minister of Trade and Industry from 1975 to 1981.

He was awarded the Queen Elizabeth II Silver Jubilee Medal in 1977, and the New Zealand 1990 Commemoration Medal.

Diplomatic career
Following his retirement from national politics, Adams-Schneider was appointed the Ambassador from New Zealand to the United States (1982–85) and to Mexico (1982–83).

In the 1984 Queen's Birthday Honours, Adams-Schneider was appointed a Knight Commander of the Order of St Michael and St George, for public services. He was also a member of the Privy Council.

Later life and death
Adams-Schneider was active in youth work and was a lay preacher in the Baptist Church.

He died on 3 September 1995. His wife, Shirley, Lady Adams-Schneider, died in Wellington on 20 May 2020.

References

Further reading

Adams-Schneider's contribution was the closing address [in Hamilton on Saturday 20 November 1965]. At this time, he was a Parliamentary Under-Secretary to the Ministers of Industries and Commerce and Customs.

Adams-Schneider's contribution was a paper entitled: "Government industrial and trade strategies: the aim"

The first edition had a Foreword by Warren Freer, this second edition has one by Lance Adams-Schneider.

External links
 

|-

|-

|-

|-

|-

1919 births
1995 deaths
Ambassadors of New Zealand to the United States
Ambassadors of New Zealand to Mexico
New Zealand National Party MPs
Members of the Cabinet of New Zealand
New Zealand MPs for North Island electorates
New Zealand Knights Commander of the Order of St Michael and St George
New Zealand members of the Privy Council of the United Kingdom
Members of the New Zealand House of Representatives
Unsuccessful candidates in the 1957 New Zealand general election
New Zealand politicians awarded knighthoods
People from Wellington City
People educated at Mount Albert Grammar School
Local politicians in New Zealand
New Zealand military personnel of World War II